Debert Airport  is located near Debert, Nova Scotia, Canada and has three runways.

It was established in 1941 as Royal Air Force (RAF) Station Debert and was used during World War II as RAF No. 31 Operational Training Unit in support of RAF Ferry Command.

In 1971, the Debert Airport and its surrounding land was purchased by the Government of Nova Scotia for development as the Debert Air Industrial Park, and in 1972, the Truro Flying Club was formed.

Today, the Debert Flight Centre, a division of the original Truro Flying Club, still provides instruction to pilots, from student pilots to commercial students.

Each summer, the airport is home to the Debert Cadet Flying Training Centre flying activities, during which a group of Royal Canadian Air Cadets train to receive their Glider Pilot's Licence.

In 2020/2021 cadet camps were canceled due to covid 19 across Canada and no lessons were taught here in Debert.  In early 2022 it was announced that Debert would no longer be used as a cadet summer training center. No cadets were present during the summer of 2022 ending a long tradition of young Canadian cadets earning their wings both power or glider.

References

External links
Debert Flight Centre

Registered aerodromes in Nova Scotia
Transport in Colchester County
Buildings and structures in Colchester County